James Tranter (1890 – 1959) was an English professional rugby league footballer who played in the 1910s and 1920s.

Playing career

International honours
Jim Tranter won caps for England while at Warrington in 1922 against Wales, and in 1923 against Wales.

Championship final appearances
Jim Tranter played right-, i.e. number 12, in Warrington's 10–22 defeat by Wigan in the Championship Final during the 1925–26 season at Knowsley Road, St. Helens on Saturday 8 May 1926.

Club career
James Tranter made his début for Warrington on Saturday 16 December 1911, and he played his last match for Warrington on Wednesday 26 December 1928.

Honoured at Warrington Wolves
Jim Tranter is a Warrington Wolves Hall of Fame inductee.

References

External links
Hall of Fame at Wire2Wolves.com
Statistics at wolvesplayers.thisiswarrington.co.uk

1890 births
1959 deaths
England national rugby league team players
English rugby league players
Lancashire rugby league team players
Rugby league centres
Rugby league players from Warrington
Warrington Wolves players